Begum Badrunnesa Govt. Girls' College (BBGGC) is an educational institute in Bangladesh. The college was incorporated in 1948 as an intermediate college under Eden Girls' College. In 1962 Eden College gained a second campus at Azimpur and the older campus at Bakshi Bazar was renamed and later separated from Eden Mohila College, Dhaka.
Badrunnesa Girls' College obtained approval of offering honours degrees in 16 subjects in 2004, and has also got approval for running master's degrees in Bangla,  English, Sociology, History and Home Economics.

Academic 
Faculty of Arts
 Bangla
 English
 Philosophy
 Islamic History and Culture

Faculty of Social Science
 Sociology
 Political Science
 Home Economics
 Economics
 Social Work

Faculty of Business Studies
 Accounting
 Finance and Banking
 Management Studies

Faculty of Science
 Physics
 Chemistry
 Mathematics
 Statistics
 Botany
 Zoology

References

External links
 BBGGC Website
 

Education in Bangladesh
1948 establishments in East Pakistan
Educational institutions established in 1948
University of Dhaka affiliates